"I Luv You HB" Demos are a collection of demos from I Love You, Honeybear. The cassette-only release features different track names than the final release and also a cover of a Cass McCombs track exclusively to "I Luv You HB" Demos. The EP was given away free with the pre-orders of the Sub Pop CD and LP edition while supplies lasted as well as with some of the Bella Union CD and LP releases for the UK and Ireland.

Track listing
 I Luv U Honeybear 	
 Chateau/First Time 	
 True Affection 	
 Smiling/Astride Me 	
 Strange Encounter 	
 "Past Is A Nightmare I'm Trying To Wake Up From" 	
 Bored In The USA 	
 Went To The Store 	
 Nobody's Nixon (Cass McCombs)

References

Josh Tillman albums
2015 EPs
Demo albums